Foreign Terrorist Organization (FTO) is a designation for non-United States-based organizations deemed by the United States Secretary of State, in accordance with section 219 of the Immigration and Nationality Act of 1965 (INA), to be involved in what US authorities define as terrorist activities. Most of the organizations on the list are Islamist extremist groups, nationalist/separatist groups, or Marxist militant groups.

The Department of State, along with the United States Department of the Treasury, also has the authority to designate individuals and entities as subject to counter-terrorism sanctions according to Executive Order 13224. The Treasury's Office of Foreign Assets Control maintains a separate list of such individuals and entities.

Identification of candidates

The Bureau of Counterterrorism and Countering Violent Extremism (CT) of the United States Department of State continually monitors the activities of groups active around the world to identify targets for the "terrorist" designation. When reviewing potential targets, S/CT looks not only at the actual attacks that a group has carried out, but also at whether the group has engaged in planning and preparations for possible future acts of violence or retains the capability and intent to carry out such acts.

Designation process

Once a target is identified, the Bureau of Counterterrorism and Countering Violent Extremism prepares a detailed "administrative record", which is a compilation of information, typically including both classified and open sources information, demonstrating that the statutory criteria for designation have been satisfied. If the Secretary of State, in consultation with the Attorney General and the Secretary of the Treasury, decides to make the designation, the United States Congress is notified of the Secretary's intent to designate the organization and given seven days to review the designation, as the INA requires. Upon the expiration of the seven-day waiting period, notice of the designation is published in the Federal Register, at which point the designation takes effect. An organization designated as an FTO may seek judicial review of the designation in the United States Court of Appeals for the District of Columbia Circuit not later than 30 days after the designation is published in the Federal Register.

Under the Intelligence Reform and Terrorism Prevention Act, the FTO may file a petition for revocation two years after the designation date (or in the case of redesignated FTOs, its most recent redesignation date) or two years after the determination date on its most recent petition for revocation. In order to provide a basis for revocation, the petitioning FTO must provide evidence that the circumstances forming the basis for the designation are sufficiently different as to warrant revocation. If no such review has been conducted during a five-year period with respect to a designation, then the Secretary of State is required to review the designation to determine whether revocation would be appropriate.

The procedural requirements for designating an organization as an FTO also apply to any redesignation of that organization. The Secretary of State may revoke a designation or redesignation at any time upon a finding that the circumstances that were the basis for the designation or redesignation have changed in such a manner as to warrant revocation, or that the national security of the United States warrants a revocation. The same procedural requirements apply to revocations made by the Secretary of State as apply to designations or redesignations. A designation may also be revoked by an Act of Congress, or set aside by a Court order.

Legal criteria for designation
(Reflecting Amendments to Section 219 of the INA in the 2001 Patriot Act)
 It must be a foreign organization.
 The organization must engage in terrorist activity, as defined in section 212 (a)(3)(B) of the INA (8 U.S.C. § 1182(a) (3)(B)),* or terrorism, as defined in section 140(d)(2) of the Foreign Relations Authorization Act, Fiscal Years 1988 and 1989 (22 U.S.C. § 2656f(d) (2)),** or retain the capability and intent to engage in terrorist activity or terrorism.
 The organization's terrorist activity or terrorism must threaten the security of U.S. nationals or the national security (national defense, foreign relations, or the economic interests) of the United States.

Legal ramifications of designation
 It is unlawful for a person in the United States or subject to the jurisdiction of the United States to knowingly provide "material support or resources" to a designated FTO. (The term "material support or resources" is defined in 18 U.S.C. § 2339A(b) as "currency or monetary instruments or financial securities, financial services, lodging, training, expert advice or assistance, safehouses, false documentation or identification, communications equipment, facilities, weapons, lethal substances, explosives, personnel, transportation, and other physical assets, except medicine or religious materials.")
 Representatives and members of a designated FTO, if they are aliens, are inadmissible to and, in certain circumstances, removable from the United States (see 8 U.S.C. §§ 1182 (a)(3)(B)(i)(IV)-(V), 1227 (a)(1)(A)).
 Any U.S. financial institution that becomes aware that it has possession of or control over funds in which a designated FTO or its agent has an interest must retain possession of or control over the funds and report the funds to the Office of Foreign Assets Control of the U.S. Department of the Treasury.

Other effects of designation

The U.S. Department of State lists the following items as additional considered beneficial effects of designation:
 Supports efforts to curb terrorism financing and to encourage other nations to do the same.
 Stigmatizes and isolates designated terrorist organizations internationally.
 Deters donations or contributions to and economic transactions with named organizations.
 Heightens public awareness and knowledge of terrorist organizations.
 Signals to other governments U.S. concern about named organizations.

Official designation of a group as a Foreign Terrorist Organization also triggers more robust means of combat under the Authorization for Use of Military Force act enacted in 2001, which is still in force today.

Groups designated as FTOs
 the following organizations are designated Foreign Terrorist Organizations:

Delisted FTOs
The following groups have been removed from the Department of State's list as of December 1, 2021, most due to having been disbanded and thus being no longer active.

Controversies

The 2012 delisting of Mujahedin-e Khalq (MEK) was supported by numerous US lawmakers, and defense and foreign policy officials, but was criticized by the National Iranian American Council. The Treasury Department investigated allegations that payments to former Pennsylvania Governor Ed Rendell, on behalf of his lobbying for the MEK, had violated the legal ban on material support for an FTO.

In November 2013, the State Department listed the Nigerian terrorist organization Boko Haram as an FTO. In 2014, Republican members of Congress criticized the State Department for not designating the group as an FTO earlier.

In August 2014 the Christian Science Monitor reported that U.S. military was coordinating with Kurdish forces in Iraq, including elements of the PKK, seemingly in violation of the ban on assistance to a designated FTO.

See also
 Executive Order 13224
 List of designated terrorist groups
 Specially Designated Global Terrorist
 U.K. List of Proscribed Groups
 State Sponsors of Terrorism (U.S. list)

References

External links
 Current official U.S. Department of State list of Foreign Terrorist Organizations
 Foreign Terrorist Organization (FTO) Congressional Research Service
 US Department of State's Foreign Terrorist Organizations, released April 8, 2008 Fact Sheet, upon which this article is based, which also contains the legal references.
 US Department of the Treasury, Office of Foreign Assets Control, 'What you need to know about U.S. Sanctions'
 European Union list of terrorist groups and individuals, 2007
 European Union list of terrorist groups and individuals, January 2009
 Kurth Cronin, Audrey; Huda Aden, Adam Frost, and Benjamin Jones (2004-02-06) (PDF). Foreign Terrorist Organizations. Congressional Research Service. Retrieved on 2009-03-04.

Foreign Terrorist Organizations
 
Terrorism-related lists
Government databases in the United States